Davide Danti (Milan, 27 February 1938 – Pisa, 4 August 2011) was an Italian illustrator/artist/translator. His major works include "Il Murale Grande" in Milan Town Hall, and "Florence Nightingale", a large outdoor mural on the wall of the Croce Bianco of Codiponte, Lunigiana. There are many other examples of his work in Lunigiana, where he maintained a studio and was frequently employed by the local Commune to decorate and beautify buildings. He regularly illustrated magazines and publications such as "Solidarieta Come" (see No 255, 1 August 2006) and was an accomplished translator in the English, French, Spanish and Portuguese languages.

References
"I Miti di Chiloe" (The Myths of the Island of Chiloe), translated into Italian by Sergio Mendez de la Fuente and illustrated by Davide Danti. Edizioni dell'Arco, Milan, 2004.
"Accanto al Camino" (Fireside Tales of Lunigiana) by Caterina Rapetti and illustrated by Davide Danti, Edizioni dell'Arco, Milan & Bologna, 2007.
Interview with Davide Danti https://www.youtube.com/watch?v=WUTsyA7fHm0

1938 births
Italian illustrators
2011 deaths